Mala Gora is a small dispersed settlement in the Municipality of Zreče in northeastern Slovenia. The area is part of the traditional region of Styria. It is now included with the rest of the municipality in the Savinja Statistical Region.

History
Until 1998, Mala Gora was a hamlet of Stranice, when it was administratively separated and made a settlement in its own right. Further territorial adjustment was made between Mala Gora and the village of Polajna in 2004.

References

External links
Mala Gora at Geopedia

Populated places in the Municipality of Zreče